Tønsberg Ishall is an ice hockey- and figure skating arena in Tønsberg, Norway. Opened in 1995, it is home to the Tønsberg Vikings of the GET-ligaen and Tønsberg Turnforening figure skating branch.

In January 2003 it was the host arena for the Norwegian figure skating championships.

External links
Tønsberg Ishall on hockeyarenas.net
Official website

Indoor ice hockey venues in Norway
1995 establishments in Norway
Sport in Vestfold og Telemark
Tønsberg
Figure skating venues in Norway